Julie Anne Dodds-Streeton  is a Reserve Judge of the Supreme Court of Victoria. She was formerly a judge of the Federal Court of Australia, having served for four years from February 2010. Prior to that, she was a Justice of Appeal in the Supreme Court of Victoria (appointed August 2007), having previously been a Judge of the Trial Division of that Court from 2002.

Early life and education

Dodds-Streeton attended University High School, Melbourne before studying at the University of Melbourne, graduating with a Bachelor of Arts with First Class Honours and then a Bachelor of Laws, also with Honours. She also was awarded a Master of Arts from Monash University.

Career

Dodds-Streeton served her articles with Paveys and was admitted as a solicitor in 1981. She worked as an academic at the Melbourne Law School, where she was a Senior Lecturer in corporate law, real property, intellectual property and equity, before becoming a barrister in 1988, where she read with Joseph Santamaria. practising principally in commercial law. Dodds-Streeton was appointed a Queen's Counsel in 2001. Dodds-Streeton was a member of the Insolvency and Corporate Reconstruction Committee of the Law Council of Australia. Dodds-Streeton was one of the counsel assisting the HIH Royal Commission, where she cross-examined Malcolm Turnbull about his role in the sale of FAI Insurance to HIH Insurance.

Supreme Court of Victoria

Dodds-Streeton was appointed to the Trial Division of the Supreme Court of Victoria on 23 July 2002, before being elevated to the Court of Appeal on 8 August 2007. Dodds-Streeton joined fellow justices Marilyn Warren and Rosemary Balmford on the court and Victoria's first all female Full Court sat for the admissions ceremony in August 2002.

Federal Court

On 1 February 2010 Dodds-Streeton was appointed to the Federal Court of Australia, where she served for four years until her retirement on 1 April 2014.

Subsequent career

Justice Dodds-Streeton was a member of the Expert Advisory Panel established in June 2015 by the Federal Government to oversee the competitive evaluation process of the Future Submarine Program. In August 2014 she was appointed as a panel member of the Commonwealth Bank's Open Advice Review Program, chaired by former High Court judge, the Honourable Justice Ian Callinan . The panel was a part of a dispute settlement procedure for customers who received financial advice from the Commonwealth Bank received between 2003 and 2012.

Since 2011 she has held the position of President of the Professional Standards Review Board, Anglican Dioceses of Melbourne, Ballarat and Wangaratta, and since 2017, also Bendigo.

She is a current Senior Fellow, Law School, University of Melbourne (since 2013); Member of the Council of Australian Law Deans - Australian Law Schools Standards Committee (since 2015); and Member and Fellow of the Australian Academy of Law (from 2016).

References

Australian King's Counsel
Judges of the Federal Court of Australia
Judges of the Supreme Court of Victoria
Australian women judges
Melbourne Law School alumni
Monash University alumni
Living people
Year of birth missing (living people)